William W. Taylor (October 1899 – 6 December 1976) was a Canadian cyclist. He competed in three events at the 1920 Summer Olympics.

References

External links
 

1899 births
1976 deaths
Canadian male cyclists
Olympic cyclists of Canada
Cyclists at the 1920 Summer Olympics
Place of birth missing